Aniconism is the absence of artistic representations (icons) of the natural and supernatural worlds, or it is the absence of representations of certain figures in religions. It is a feature of various cultures, particularly of cultures which are based on monotheistic Abrahamic religions. The prohibition of material representations may only extend from God and other supernatural beings to saint-like characters, or it may extend to material representations of all living beings, and material representations of everything that exists. The phenomenon is generally codified by religious traditions and as such, it becomes a taboo. When it is enforced by the physical destruction of images, aniconism becomes iconoclasm. 

Aniconism has been a historical phase in both Buddhism and Christianity, and even though it is much less of an issue today, the attitudes towards religious imagery show considerable variability between different traditions, denominations, and strands within each religion.  Judaism and Islam have predominantly been aniconistic throughout their histories, but they have not been exclusively so. In all these religions the depiction of the monotheistic deity (God the Father, Allah, Yahweh) is especially forbidden or disapproved of, and material representations of major figures such as Muhammad and Gautama Buddha, have frequently been sensitive topics, especially in the past. 

The word "aniconism" is derived from Greek εικων 'image' with the negative prefix an- (Greek privative alpha) and the suffix -ism (Greek -ισμος).  Iconoclasm is the active destruction of images for religious or cultural reasons.

General aspects

In monotheistic religions, aniconism was shaped by theological considerations and historical contexts. It emerged as a corollary in which people believed that God was the ultimate power holder, and people who practiced it believed that they needed to defend God's unique status against competing external and internal forces, such as pagan idols and critical humans. Idolatry was seen as a threat to God's uniqueness, and one way in which prophets and missionaries chose to fight against it was through the prohibition of physical representations.  The same solution worked against humans who pretended to have the same power of creation that God had (hence, their banishment from the Heavens, the destruction of Babel, and the Second Commandment in the biblical texts).

Some modern scholars who have studied various cultures have gathered material which shows that in many cases, the idea of aniconism is an intellectual construction rather than a fact of tangible reality, it suits specific intents and historical contexts.

In Buddhism

Since the beginning of the serious study of the history of Buddhist art in the 1890s, the earliest phase, which lasted until the 1st century CE, has been described as aniconistic; the Buddha was only represented with symbols such as an empty throne, a Bodhi tree, a riderless horse with a parasol floating above an empty space (at Sanchi), Buddha's footprints, and the dharma wheel.  However, other persons and their surroundings are often depicted in great numbers and care, and the scenes are often crowded, but with an empty space in the centre.

In relation to the image of the Buddha, this aniconistic tradition could have been based on an ancient Buddhist rule which prohibited images of the Buddha in which he appeared in human form, a rule which is written in the Sarvastivada vinaya (the rules of the early Buddhist school of the Sarvastivada): "Since it is not permitted to make an image of the Buddha's body, I pray that the Buddha will grant that I can make an image of the attendant Bodhisattva. Is that acceptable?" The Buddha answered: "You may make an image of the Bodhisattava".

Although they are still a subject of debate, the first anthropomorphic representations of the Buddha are frequently considered a result of the Greco-Buddhist interaction, a cultural exchange which was particularly widespread in Gandhara, a theory which was first fully expounded upon by Alfred A. Foucher, but from the start, it was criticized by Ananda Coomaraswamy.  Foucher also accounted for the origins of the aniconistic symbols by collecting small souvenirs which he removed from the main pilgrimage sites and carried away, souvenirs which were later recognized and popularized as symbols of the events which occurred at the site.  Other explanations stated that it was inappropriate to represent a person who had attained nirvana.

However, in 1990, the notion of aniconism in Buddhism was challenged by Susan Huntington, initiating a vigorous debate among specialists that still continues to occur.  She sees many early scenes claimed to be aniconic as in fact not depicting scenes from the life of the Buddha, but worship of cetiya (relics) or re-enactments by devotees at the places where these scenes occurred.  Thus the image of the empty throne shows an actual relic-throne at Bodh Gaya or elsewhere.  She points out that there is only one indirect reference for a specific aniconic doctrine in Buddhism to be found, and that pertaining to only one sect.

As for the archeological evidence, it shows that some anthropomorphic sculptures of the Buddha actually existed during the supposedly aniconistic period, which ended during the 1st century CE.  Huntington also rejects the association of "aniconistic" and "iconic" art with the division that emerged between Theravada and Mahayana Buddhism.  Huntington's views have been challenged by Vidya Dehejia and others.  Although some earlier examples of them have been found in recent years, it is widely-believed that the large free-standing iconic images of the Buddha which are so prevalent in later works of Buddhist art are not prevalent in works of Buddhist art which were produced during the earliest period of the history of Buddhism; discussion is focused on smaller figures in relief panels, conventionally considered to represent scenes from the life of the Buddha, and now re-interpreted by Huntington and her supporters.

In Hinduism

Although aniconism is better known in connection to Abrahamic religions, basic patterns are shared between various religious beliefs including Hinduism, which also has aniconistic beliefs. For example, although Hinduism is commonly represented by such anthropomorphic religious murtis, aniconism is equally represented with such abstract symbols of God such as the Shiva linga and the saligrama. Moreover, Hindus have found it easier to focus on anthropomorphic icons, because Krishna in the Bhagavad Gita, chapter 12, verse 5, said that it is much more difficult to focus on God as the unmanifested than God with form, because human beings have a need to perceive via the senses.

In Christianity

Byzantine iconoclasm

There were two periods of iconoclasm, or icon-destruction, in the Byzantine Empire, in the mid eighth and early ninth centuries. The political aspects of the conflicts are complex, dealing with the relationship between the Byzantine Emperors, the Catholic Church and Orthodox Church councils, and the Pope. Theologically, the debate, as with most in Orthodox theology at the time, revolved around the two natures of Jesus. Iconoclasts believed that icons could not represent both the divine and the human natures of the Messiah at the same time, but separately. Because an icon which depicted Jesus as purely physical would be Nestorianism, and one which showed Him as both human and divine would not be able to do so without confusing the two natures into one mixed nature, which was Monophysitism, all icons were thus heretical. Reference was also made to the prohibitions on the worship of graven images in the Law of Moses.

During the Protestant Reformation

Aniconism was also prevalent during the Protestant Reformation, when some Protestants began to preach rejection of what they perceived as idolatrous Catholic practices which filled its churches with pictures, statues, or relics of saints. The Reformed (Calvinist) churches and certain sects (most notably the Puritans and some of the Baptist churches) began to prohibit the display of religious images.  A famous example of this comes from Oliver Cromwell, who expelled King Charles I, and who once destroyed a golden relic placed in his church.

Among Christians today
In the Church of the East, also known as the Nestorian church, opposition to religious images eventually became the norm due to the rise of Islam in the region, where it forbade any type of depictions of saints and biblical prophets. As such, the Church was forced to get rid of their icons. This tradition is still in practice today, with many Assyrian churches lacking artistic depictions of biblical figures, including those of Jesus and Mary.

Some Amish prefer not to have their photo taken. This has been attributed to the Biblical commandment "Thou shalt not make unto thyself a graven image," and the belief that photographs can "steal your soul," among other reasons. Modern Amish differ in their attitudes towards photography, with some accepting it as a part of the modern world around them.

Among Jehovah's Witnesses, followers are prohibited from wearing religious themed jewelry displaying icons such as the cross, as idol worship is prohibited. Having images or sculptures of Jesus, Jehovah (God), and angels is also considered a taboo according to their interpretation of Exodus 20:4,5 and 1 Corinthians 10:14. Followers are also admonished to avoid any objects portraying depictions of the supernatural.

In Islam

Theological views
The Quran, the Islamic holy book, does not explicitly prohibit the depiction of human figures; it merely condemns idolatry (e.g.: 5:92, 21:52). Interdictions of figurative representation are present in the Hadith, among a dozen of the hadith recorded during the latter part of the period when they were being written down.  Because these hadith are tied to particular events in the life of the Prophet Muhammad, they need to be interpreted in order to be applied in any general manner. Sunni exegetes, from the 9th century onward, increasingly saw in them categorical prohibitions against producing and using any representation of living beings. There are variations between religious schools and marked differences between different branches of Islam. Aniconism is common among fundamentalist Sunni sects such as Salafis and Wahhabis (which are also often iconoclastic), and less prevalent among liberal movements in Islam. Shi'a and mystical orders also have less stringent views on aniconism.  On the individual level, whether or not specific Muslims believe in aniconism may depend on how much credence is given to hadith (e.g. Submitters do not believe in any hadith), and how liberal or strict they are in personal practice.

Aniconism in Islam not only deals with the material image, but touches upon mental representations as well. It is a thorny question, discussed by early theologians, as to how to describe God, Muhammad and other prophets, and, indeed, if it is permissible at all to do so. God is usually represented by immaterial attributes, such as "holy" or "merciful", commonly known from His "Ninety-nine beautiful names". Muhammad's physical appearance, however, is amply described, particularly in the traditions on his life and deeds, Sira al-Nabi. Of no less interest is the validity of sightings of holy personages made during dreams.

Aniconism in practice

In practice, the core of normative religion in Islam is consistently aniconic. Its embodiment are spaces such as the mosque and objects like the Qur'an or the white dress of pilgrims entering Mecca, deprived of figurative images. Other spheres of religion – schisms, mysticism, popular piety, private level – exhibit in this regard significant variability. Profane aniconism is even more fluctuating. Generally speaking aniconism in Islamic societies is restricted in modern times to specific religious contexts, while its prevalence in the past wasn't enforced in numerous areas and during extended periods.

Depending on which segment of Islamic societies are referred to, the application of aniconism is characterized with noteworthy differences. Factors are the epoch considered, the country, the religious orientation, the political intent, the popular beliefs, the private benefit or the dichotomy between reality and discourse. Today, the concept of an aniconic Islam coexists with a daily life for Muslims awash with images. TV stations and newspapers (which do present still and moving representations of living beings) have an exceptional impact on public opinion, sometimes, as in the case of Al Jazeera, with a global reach, beyond the Arabic-speaking and Muslim audience. Portraits of secular and religious leaders are omnipresent on banknotes and coins, in streets and offices (e.g.: presidents like Nasser and Mubarak, Arafat, Al-Asad or Hezbollah's Nasrallah and ayatollah Khomeini). Anthropomorphic statues in public places are to be found in most Muslim countries  (Saddam Hussain's are infamous), as well as arts schools training sculptors and painters.  In the Egyptian countryside, it is fashionable to celebrate and advertise the returning of pilgrims from Mekka on the walls of their houses. Sometimes those who profess aniconism will practice figurative representation (cf. portraits of Talibans from the Kandahar photographic studios during their imposed ban on photography). For Shi'a communities, portraits of the major figures of Shi'ite history are important elements of religious devotion. Portraits of 'Ali – with veiled and unveiled face alike – can be bought in Iran around shrines and in the streets, to be hung in homes or carried with oneself, while in Pakistan, India and Bangladesh they notoriously ornate trucks, buses and rickshas. Contrary to the Sunni tradition, a photographic picture of the deceased can be placed on the Shi'ite tombs. A curiosity in Iran is an Orientalist photography supposed to represent Prophet Muhammad as a young boy. The Grand Ayatollah Sistani of Najaf in Iraq has given a fatwa declaring the depiction of Muhammad, the Prophets and other holy characters, permissible if it is made with the utmost respect.

Neither is the representation of living beings in Islamic countries a modern phenomenon or due to current technology, westernization or the cult of the personality. Statues of humans and animals adorned palaces of the Ummayad era, while frescoes were common under the Umayyads, and later in many Muslim countries, notably under the Safavids and various Central Asian dynasties. Figurative miniatures from Medieval Arabic countries, India, Persia and Turkey are among the pinnacles of Islamic art and account for a good deal of its attraction. Potent rulers like Shah Tahmasp in Persia and Akbar in India, patrons of some of the most beautiful figurative miniatures in arts from Islamic countries, migrated during their life between an extravagant 'figurative' and an extremist 'aniconic' period. During the 15th and 17th century representations of Muhammad (veiled, unveiled) and other prophets or Biblical characters, like Adam, Abraham or Jesus; and Solomon and Alexander the Great, became common in painted manuscripts from Persia, India and Turkey. Extreme rarities are an illustrated Qur'an depicting Muhammad and, in a Spanish-Muslim manuscript datable from the 16th century, five Umayyad and Abbasid caliphs. Iblis too is present in various illustrated manuscripts. However, there are no known figurative depictions of God.

Medieval Muslim artists found various ways not to infringe any prohibition of the image, while still representing living beings. It can be argued that since God is absolute, the act of depiction is his own and not that of a human; and miniatures are obviously very crude representations of the reality, so the two can't be mistaken. At the material level, prophets in manuscripts can have their face covered by a veil or all humans have a stroke drawn over their neck, a symbolic cut preventing them from being alive. Calligraphy, the most Islamic of arts in the Muslim world, has also its figurative side due to anthropo- and zoomorphic calligrams.

In Judaism

Hebrew Bible  
A number of verses in the Hebrew Bible (Tanakh) refer to prohibitions against the creation of various forms of images, invariably linked directly with idolatry. The strongest source is based on what Judaism counts as the second of the Ten Commandments:

Leviticus 26:1 reads:

Similar injunctions appear in Numbers 33:52, Deuteronomy 4:16, and 27:15; in all cases, the creation of the image is associated with idolatry, and indeed, the words commonly translated as 'image' or some variant thereof are generally used interchangeably with words typically translated as 'idol' (e.g.  ).

Based on these prohibitions, the Hebrew prophets, such as Isaiah, Jeremiah, Amos, and others, preached very strongly against idolatry. In many of their sermons, as recorded in the biblical books bearing their names, the prophets regarded the use of religious images as a negative sign of assimilation into the surrounding pagan cultures of the time. Lenient Torah commentators permit drawing of humans as long as the images are not used for idolatry.

Halakha 

Despite the semantic association with idols, halakha (Jewish law) as codified by the Shulkhan Aruch interprets the verses as prohibiting the creation of certain types of graven images of people, angels, or astronomical bodies, whether or not they are actually used as idols. The Shulkhan Aruch states: "It is forbidden to make complete solid or raised images of people or angels, or any images of heavenly bodies except for purposes of study". ("Heavenly bodies" are included here because the stars and planets were worshipped by some religions in human forms. Astronomical models for scientific purposes are permitted under the category of "study.")

The prohibition is therefore seen as applying specifically to certain forms of sculpture and depictions of the human face. In keeping with this prohibition, some illustrations from the Middle Ages feature fantastic creatures—usually animal-headed humanoids, even when the depictions are quite clearly meant to be those of historical or mythological humans. The most well-known is the Birds' Head Haggadah (Germany, circa 1300). Because such creatures as gryphons, harpies, sphinxes, and the phoenix do not actually exist, no violation of the prohibition is perceived in such depictions. This is based on the fact that the commandment, as stated in Exodus, refers specifically to "anything in the heaven above, on the earth below, or in the water below the land." However, it is forbidden to make the four faces on the Divine Chariot of the Book of Ezekiel or the ministering angels, because these are believed to be real beings that actually exist "in the heaven above." (Kitzur Shulchan Aruch 168:1)

Differences across media 

Although the prohibition mainly applies to sculpture, there are some authorities who also prohibit two-dimensional full-face depictions. Some base this upon their understanding of the Talmud, and others based it upon Kabbalah. Of note is the portrait of Rabbi Tzvi Ashkenazi (known as "the Hakham Tzvi"), which is housed in the Jewish Museum in London. Based on his interpretation of this prohibition, Tzvi refused to sit for his portrait. However, the London Jewish Community wanted a portrait, so they commissioned the portrait to be done without the Tzvi's knowledge. Tzvi's son, Rabbi Jacob Emden, says it was a perfect likeness.

There is one type of representation, bas-relief or raised representation on a flat surface, that is particularly problematic. Rabbi Jacob Emden discusses a medal struck in honor of Rabbi Eliezer Horowitz that features Horowitz's portrait. Emden ruled this violated the injunction against depictions. Many hold that such representations in the synagogue either violate this injunction or are not permitted, as they give the appearance of violating this injunction. Most notably, Rabbi David ibn Zimra and Rabbi Joseph Karo hold that carvings of lions (representing the Lion of Judah) are inappropriate in synagogues.

Some authorities hold that Judaism has no objection to photography or other forms of two-dimensional art, and depictions of humans can be seen in religious books such as the Passover Haggadah, as well as children's books about biblical and historical personages. Although most Hasidic Jews object to having televisions in their homes, this is not related to prohibitions against idolatry, but, rather, to the content of network and cable programming. Hasidim of all groups regularly display portraits of their Rebbes, and, in some communities, the children trade "rabbi cards" that are similar to baseball cards. In both Hasidic and Orthodox Judaism, taking photographs or filming are forbidden on the Shabbat and Jewish holy days, but this prohibition has nothing to do with idolatry. Rather, it is related to the prohibition against working or creating on these days.

In historical periods 

Many art historians have long believed that in antiquity, there was a tradition, with no surviving examples, of scroll production in which luxuriously illuminated manuscript scrolls which contained the texts of the books of the Tanakh were produced by Hellenized Jews. Evidence of this tradition exists in the form of Late Ancient and Early Medieval Christian works which contain iconography which is thought to be derived from older iconography which was contained in works which were produced in accordance with this Hellenistic Jewish tradition. Examples of the later works include the Joshua Roll and, more controversially, the Utrecht Psalter.

The 3rd century CE Dura-Europos synagogue in Syria has large areas of wall paintings with figures of the prophets and others, and narrative scenes. There are several representations of the Hand of God, suggesting that this motif reached Christian art from Judaism. A virtually unique Christian mosaic depiction of the Ark of the Covenant (806) at Germigny-des-Prés, which includes the hand, is believed also to be derived from Jewish iconography; the Ark also appears at Dura-Europos. Several ancient synagogues in the land of Israel have also been excavated, revealing large floor-mosaics with figurative elements, especially animals and representations of the Zodiac.

Some of these, notably at Naaran in the West Bank, have had the living figures removed, leaving inanimate symbols such as the Temple menorah intact. It has been proposed that this was done by the Jewish community in the 6th or early 7th century, as part of a controversy within Judaism over images that paralleled that within Christianity leading to the Byzantine iconoclasm, leading to a stricter attitude towards images, at least in synagogues. There is also evidence that from about 570 new synagogue mosaics were aniconic. An alternative explanation for the removals is that they were done after the Muslim conquest, and related to the decree of Caliph Yazid II in 721 (although this referred to Christian images). The decoration of cave walls and sarcophagi at the Jewish cemetery at Beit She'arim also uses images, some drawn from Hellenistic pagan mythology, in the 2nd to 4th centuries CE.

There are many later Jewish illuminated manuscripts from the Middle Ages, and some other works with human figures. The "Birds' Head Haggadah" (German, now in Jerusalem) gives all the human figures the heads of birds, presumably in an attempt to mitigate any breach of the prohibition.

Recent scholarship 
In a refutation of the belief in an aniconistic form of Judaism, and more generally in an underestimation of Jewish visual arts, the historian of ideas Kalman Bland recently proposed that the phenomenon is a modern construction, and he backed up his claim by stating that "Jewish aniconism crystallized simultaneously with the construction of modern Jewish identities". Others have also argued that the notion of a total prohibition of figural representation in the Biblical and Hellenistic-Roman periods is untenable.

Until the 20th century, Judaism was always believed to have been an aniconistic religion. This view was probably first challenged by David Kaufmann, who marshalled a large and comprehensive corpus of data in order to prove that this belief was untenable. He was the first person to use the term "Jewish art" in an article which he published in 1878, and he is also considered the founder of the scholarly discipline of Jewish art history. In 1901, his disciple Dr. Samuel Krauss wrote:

In the Baháʼí Faith

For the followers of the Baháʼí Faith, the photographs and depictions of the Báb and Bahá'u'lláh, who are considered Manifestations of God, are considered very precious.  They are viewed and handled with reverence and respect, and their existence itself is not considered offensive.  However, Shoghi Effendi, the Guardian of the Baháʼí Faith, stated that believers should only view the images when they can be treated with the utmost respect, and not let them be exposed to the public or displayed in their private homes:
"There is no objection that the believers look at the picture of Bahá'u'lláh, but they should do so with the utmost reverence, and should also not allow that it be exposed openly to the public, even in their private homes."
(From a letter written on behalf of Shoghi Effendi to an individual believer, December 6, 1939, republished in Lights of Guidance, p. 540)

Shoghi Effendi has also written in the Directives from the Guardian regarding the portrait of the Báb:
"The portrait of the Báb should be regarded as an inestimable privilege and blessing to behold, as past generations were denied a glimpse of the Face of the Manifestation, once He had passed on."
(Shoghi Effendi, Directives from the Guardian, p. 43)

Two pictures of Bahá'u'lláh and a portrait of the Báb are on display at the Baháʼí World Centre in the International Archives building, where the Baháʼís view it as part of an organized Baháʼí pilgrimage.

Other religions
In Africa aniconism varies from culture to culture from elaborate masks and statues of humans and animals to their total absence. A common feature, however, across the continent, is the refusal to give the "High God" a material shape.

About the Germanic tribes, the Roman historian Tacitus writes the following: "They don't consider it mighty enough for the Heavens to depict Gods on walls or to display them in some human shape." His observation was not general to all the Germanic peoples (or, similar to the Greeks, it evolved after his time) as documentary evidence suggests (see Ardre image stones).

In the ancient Etruscan religion, the dii involuti or "veiled gods", a group of gods who were superior to the ordinary pantheon and regulated the infliction of disasters, were never named or depicted. Depictions of gods more generally were infrequent in Etruscan civilization until after the adoption of Greek influences in the "Orientalizing" period of the 7th–6th centuries BC, and sometimes carried negative associations, their faces in particular. An Etruscan divination calendar describes being "visited with visions of the faces of the gods" as a negative event.

In some Australian Aboriginal cultural groups, the "naming and depiction of recently deceased people is often prohibited under customary law and the mourning period may last for weeks, months or years". It is believed that depicting them will inhibit their passage to the Great Dreaming of the Ancestors. Some broadcasters (such as the ABC) include content warnings in programs or articles that depict Aboriginal people. The prohibition does not apply to the depiction of non-Aboriginal people who are deceased.

See also
Censorship
Censorship by organized religion
 The figurative representation in Islamic Arts
Jyllands-Posten Muhammad cartoons controversy

References

Sources
 Jack Goody, Representations and Contradictions: Ambivalence Towards Images, Theatre, Fiction, Relics and Sexuality, London, Blackwell Publishers, 1997. .
 
 S. L. Huntington, "Early Buddhist art and the theory of aniconism", Art Journal, 49:4 (1990): 401–8. 
 Terry Allen, "Aniconism and Figural Representation in Islamic Art", Five Essays on Islamic Art, Occidental (CA), Solipsist, 1988.  
  Gilbert Beaugé & Jean-François Clément, L'image dans le monde arabe [The image in the Arab world], Paris, CNRS Éditions, 1995, 
  Rudi Paret, Das islamische Bilderverbot und die Schia [The Islamic prohibition of images and the Shi'a], Erwin Gräf (ed.), Festschrift Werner Caskel, Leiden, 1968, 224–32.
 Kalman P. Bland, The Artless Jew: Medieval and Modern Affirmations and Denials of the Visual, Princeton, Princeton University Press, 2001.  Introduction: 

 
Aesthetics
Censorship
Religion in culture